Mark of the Devil may refer to:

Mark of the Devil (1970 film), a 1970 West German film
Mark of the Devil (2020 film), a 2020 Mexican film